Dr. László Kovács (March 27, 1941 – December 5, 2001) was a Hungarian physician and politician, member of the National Assembly (MP) for Érd (Pest County Constituency VIII) between 1990 and 1994.

References

1941 births
2001 deaths
Hungarian Democratic Forum politicians
Members of the National Assembly of Hungary (1990–1994)
People from Tapolca
20th-century Hungarian physicians